Sergey Solovyov or Sergei Solovyov may refer to the following Russian people: 
Sergei Solovyov (Catholic priest) (1885–1942), Russian poet and priest
Sergei Solovyov (film director) (born 1944), Russian film director
Sergey Solovyov (footballer) (1915–1967), Soviet footballer
Sergey Solovyov (historian) (1820–1879), Russian historian
Sergey Solovyov (mathematician) (born 1955), Russian mathematician
Sergey Solovyov (politician) (born 1985), Russian politician